The 1996 United States Olympic trials for swimming events were held from March 6 to 12 in Indianapolis, Indiana.  It was the qualifying meet for American swimmers who hoped to compete at the 1996 Summer Olympics in Atlanta.

Results 
Key:

Men's events

Women's events

See also
United States at the 1996 Summer Olympics
United States Olympic Trials (swimming)
USA Swimming

External links
  1996 US Olympic swimming trials report at Usaswimming.org

United States Olympic trials
United States Summer Olympics Trials
Swimming Olympic trials